Rachel Hunter is the name of

 Rachel Hunter (born 1969), New Zealand model, actress and reality TV show host
 Rachel Hunter (author) (ca. 1754–1813), English novelist
 Rachel Hunter (equestrian) (born 1969), Canadian Olympic equestrian